Rini Fatimah Zaelani (born 1 August 1980), known professionally as Syahrini, is an Indonesian singer and actress. She spent her childhood in Sukabumi, and later earned a bachelor's degree in law from Pakuan University in Bogor. Her first album was My Lovely, released in 2008. Also in her discography is the song "Tatapan Cinta," which appeared on the compilation soundtrack album of the film Coklat Stroberi (Chocolate Strawberry).

Career
In 2008, she collaborated with songwriters, including Dewiq and Yovie Widianto, for her first pop solo album, My Lovely. Two songs from that album, "Bohong" (Lies) and "My Lovely", were released as singles. In mid-2009, Syahrini released the single "Pusing Setengah Mati".

In late 2009, Syahrini met Anang Hermansyah on a TV show who then asked her to be his duet partner. Together they released the singles "Jangan Memilih Aku" (Don't Choose Me) and "Cinta Terakhir" (The Last Love).

In 2010, she recorded a cover version of the late Alda Risma's song "Aku Tak Biasa" (I'm Not Used To Be), and reestablished her career as an independent solo female singer, after the collaboration with him ended.

Legal disputes
On 2 May 2011, Syahrini was sued for a contract management mistake.

In February 2014, Syahrini was allegedly associated in a corruption case of the procurement of medical equipment in Banten province, along with Jennifer Dunn, Catherine Wilson, and Aura Kasih. The main suspect, Tubagus Chaeri Wardana (a.k.a. Wawan), who was prosecuted by Indonesia's Corruption Eradication Commission (KPK), was rumored to be not only romantically but also sexually involved with these famous women. The Indonesian media also reported that Wawan, who is the brother of Banten Province's Governor, Ratu Atut Chosiyah, spent the corrupted money on expensive gifts for several female celebrities, including Syahrini. She denied the rumor.

Musical influences
She mentions Tata Young and Beyoncé Knowles as her inspirations, besides Indonesian pop diva, Krisdayanti. She also cites the girl group Pussycat Dolls, Rihanna, Kim Kardashian, (whom when has been compared to) and Jacqueline Kennedy Onassis as her fashion inspirations.

Discography

Studio albums
 My Lovely (2008)
 Semua Karena Cinta (2012)

Mini album
 Jangan Memilih Aku (with Anang Hermansyah) (2009)

Singles

Filmography

Awards and nominations

References

External links

1980 births
21st-century Indonesian women singers
Indonesian pop singers
Indonesian socialites
Sundanese people
Indonesian actresses
People from Sukabumi
Living people
Indonesian Muslims